The David di Donatello for Best Costumes is a film award presented annually by the Accademia del Cinema Italiano (ACI, Academy of Italian Cinema) to recognize outstanding efforts on the part of film costume designers who have worked within the Italian film industry during the year preceding the ceremony. It was first presented during the 1981 edition of the David di Donatello award show.

Winners and nominees
Winners are indicated in bold.

1980s
1981
 Piero Tosi - The Lady of the Camellias
 Gabriella Pescucci - Three Brothers
 Luciano Calosso - Fontamara

1982
 Gianna Gissi - Il marchese del Grillo
 Luca Sabatelli - Portrait of a Woman, Nude
 Enzo Bulgarelli - Forest of Love

1983
 Gabriella Pescucci - That Night in Varennes
 Nicoletta Ercole - The Story of Piera
 Lucia Mirisola - State buoni se potete
 Lina Nerli Taviani - The Night of the Shooting Stars

1984
 Nanà Cecchi - Hearts and Armour
 Ezio Altieri - Le Bal
 Maurizio Millenotti - And the Ship Sails On

1985
 Enrico Job - Carmen
 Lina Nerli Taviani - Kaos
 Mario Carlini - A Proper Scandal

1986
 Danilo Donati - Ginger and Fred
 Gino Persico - Camorra
 Aldo Buti - The Venetian Woman

1987
 Gabriella Pescucci - The Name of the Rose
 Anna Anni and Maurizio Millenotti - Otello
 Gabriella Pescucci - The Family

1988
 James Acheson and Ugo Pericoli - The Last Emperor
 Nanà Cecchi - The Gold Rimmed Glasses
 Carlo Diappi - Dark Eyes

1989
 Lucia Mirisola - 'O Re
 Danilo Donati - Francesco
 Gabriella Pescucci - Splendor

1990s
1990
 Gianna Gissi - Open Doors
 Milena Canonero and Alberto Verso - The Bachelor
 Maurizio Millenotti - The Voice of the Moon
 Danda Ortona - Scugnizzi
 Graziella Virgili - The Story of Boys & Girls

1991
 Lucia Mirisola - In the Name of the Sovereign People
 Odette Nicoletti - Captain Fracassa's Journey
 Francesco Panni - Mediterraneo
 Antonella Berardi - The Amusements of Private Life
 Lina Nerli Taviani - The Sun Also Shines at Night

1992
 Lina Nerli Taviani - Rossini! Rossini!
 Enrica Barbano - The Wicked
 Gianna Gissi - The Stolen Children

1993
 Elisabetta Beraldo - Jonah Who Lived in the Whale
 Lina Nerli Taviani - Fiorile
 Sissi Parravicini - Magnificat

1994
 Piero Tosi - Sparrow
 Maurizio Millenotti - The Secret of the Old Woods
 Gabriella Pescucci - For Love, Only for Love

1995
 Olga Berlutti - Farinelli
 Elisabetta Beraldo - Sostiene Pereira
 Moidele Bickel - La Reine Margot

1996
 Jenny Beavan - Jane Eyre
 Beatrice Bordone - The Star Maker
 Luciano Sagoni - Celluloide

1997
 Danilo Donati - Marianna Ucrìa
 Patrizia Chericoni and Florence Emir - Nirvana
 Lina Nerli Taviani - The Elective Affinities
 Francesca Sartori - The Prince of Homburg
 Alberto Verso - The Truce

1998
 Danilo Donati - Life Is Beautiful
 Vittoria Guaita - The Best Man
 Maurizio Millenotti - The Bride's Journey

1999
 Maurizio Millenotti - The Legend of 1900
 Gianna Gissi - The Way We Laughed
 Gino Persico - Ferdinando and Carolina

2000s
2000
 Sergio Ballo - The Nanny
 Alfonsina Lettieri - Canone inverso
 Lucia Mirisola - La Carbonara

2001
 Elisabetta Montaldo - One Hundred Steps
 Maurizio Millenotti - Malèna
 Odette Nicoletti - Unfair Competition

2002
 Francesca Sartori - The Profession of Arms
 Nanà Cecchi - The Knights of the Quest
 Maria Rita Barbera - Light of My Eyes
 Silvia Nebiolo - Burning in the Wind

2003
 Danilo Donati - Pinocchio
 Mario Carlini and Francesco Crivellini - Incantato
 Elena Mannini - A Journey Called Love
 Francesca Sartori - The Soul Keeper
 Andrea Viotti - El Alamein: The Line of Fire

2004
 Francesca Sartori - Singing Behind Screens
 Gemma Mascagni - What Will Happen to Us
 Elisabetta Montaldo - The Best of Youth
 Silvia Nebiolo - Agata and the Storm
 Isabella Rizza - Don't Move

2005
 Daniela Ciancio - The Remains of Nothing
 Maria Rita Barbera - The Life That I Want
 Catia Dottori - Cuore Sacro
 Gianna Gissi - An Italian Romance
 Gemma Mascagni - Manual of Love

2006
 Nicoletta Taranta - Romanzo Criminale
 Francesco Crivellini - The Second Wedding Night
 Annalisa Giacci - Fuoco su di me
 Tatiana Romanoff - My Best Enemy
 Lina Nerli Taviani - The Caiman

2007
 Mariano Tufano - Nuovomondo
 Maurizio Millenotti - Napoleon and Me
 Nicoletta Ercole - The Unknown Woman
 Mariarita Barbera - My Brother Is an Only Child
 Lina Nerli Taviani - The Lark Farm

2008
 Milena Canonero - I Viceré
 Ortensia De Francesco - Don't Waste Your Time, Johnny!
 Catia Dottori - Hotel Meina
 Maurizio Millenotti - Parlami d'amore
 Silvia Nebiolo and Patrizia Mazzon - Days and Clouds
 Alessandra Toesca - Quiet Chaos

2009
 Elisabetta Montaldo - The Demons of St. Petersberg
 Alessandra Cardini - Gomorrah
 Mario Carlini and Francesco Crivellini - Giovanna's Father
 Daniela Ciancio - Il divo
 Lia Morandini - Caravaggio

2010s
2010
 Sergio Ballo - Vincere
 Luigi Bonanno  - Baarìa
 Lia Francesca Morandini - The Man Who Will Come
 Gabriella Pescucci - The First Beautiful Thing
 Alessandro Lai - Loose Cannons

2011
 Ursula Patzak - Noi credevamo
 Alfonsina Lettieri - Amici miei - Come tutto ebbe inizio
 Nanà Cecchi - Christine Cristina
 Francesca Sartori - La Passione
 Roberto Chiocchi - Angel of Evil

2012
 Lina Nerli Taviani - We Have a Pope
 Rossano Marchi - Kryptonite!
 Alessandro Lai - Magnificent Presence
 Francesca Livia Sartori - Piazza Fontana: The Italian Conspiracy
 Karen Patch - This Must Be the Place

2013
 Maurizio Millenotti - The Best Offer
 Patrizia Chericoni - Siberian Education
 Grazia Colombini - It Was the Son
 Alessandro Lai - Appartamento ad Atene
 Roberta Vecchi and Francesca Vecchi - Diaz – Don't Clean Up This Blood

2014
 Daniela Ciancio - The Great Beauty
 Maria Rita Barbera - Those Happy Years
 Alessandro Lai - Fasten Your Seatbelts
 Bettina Pontiggia - Human Capital
 Cristiana Ricceri - The Mafia Kills Only in Summer

2015
 Ursula Patzak - Leopardi
 Marina Roberti - Black Souls
 Alessandro Lai - Latin Lover
 Lina Nerli Taviani - Wondrous Boccaccio
 Andrea Cavalletto - Greenery Will Bloom Again

2016
 Massimo Cantini Parrini - Tale of Tales
 Gemma Mascagni - The Correspondence
 Mary Montalto - They Call Me Jeeg
 Chiara Ferrantini - Don't Be Bad
 Carlo Poggioli - Youth

2017
 Massimo Cantini Parrini - Indivisible
  Cristiana Riccieri - At War with Love
 Catia Dottori - Like Crazy
 Beatrice Giannini and Elisabetta Antico - La stoffa dei sogni
 Cristina Laparola - Italian Race

2018
 Daniela Salernitano - Ammore e malavita
 Massimo Cantini Parrini - Bloody Richard
 Nicoletta Taranta - Agadah
 Anna Lombardi - Brutti e cattivi
 Alessandro Lai - Napoli velata

2019
 Ursula Patzak - Capri-Revolution
 Giulia Piersanti - Call Me by Your Name
 Massimo Cantini Parrini - Dogman
 Loredana Buscemi - Happy as Lazzaro
 Carlo Poggioli - Loro

2020s
2020
 Massimo Cantini Parrini - Pinocchio
 Nicoletta Taranta - 5 Is the Perfect Number
 Valentina Taviani - The First King: Birth of an Empire
 Daria Calvelli - The Traitor
 Andrea Cavalletto - Martin Eden

References

External links
 
 David di Donatello official website

David di Donatello
Awards for film costume design